Samuel H. Bellman (August 16, 1906 – January 12, 1999) was an American lawyer and politician.

Bellman was born in New York City, New York. He lived in Minneapolis, Minnesota, and graduated from Minneapolis North High School. He went to Columbia University and then received his law degree from University of Minnesota Law School. Bellman lived in Minneapolis with his wife and family and practiced law in Minneapolis. Bellman was a member of the Minnesota Farmer–Labor Party and served in the Minnesota House of Representatives from 1935 to 1938. He died at Park Shore Assisted Living in St. Louis Park, Minnesota.

References

1906 births
1999 deaths
Lawyers from Minneapolis
Politicians from Minneapolis
Politicians from New York City
Lawyers from New York City
Columbia University alumni
University of Minnesota Law School alumni
Minnesota Farmer–Laborites
Members of the Minnesota House of Representatives